VDR may refer to:

 Vdr, an archaic abbreviation for "van der"
 vdR, abbreviation for "van der Roest", a family name of Dutch origin
 Vandalur railway station, Chennai, Tamil Nadu, India (station code)
 Verein Deutscher Rosenfreunde, the Union of German Friends of Roses
 Vertical dimension at rest, a mandibular position used in dentistry to estimate vertical dimension of occlusion
 Virginia Declaration of Rights
 Virtual data room
 Vitamin D receptor
 Video Disk Recorder, also known as Linux VDR, a software to record and store digital video on a Linux computer
 Voltage-dependent resistor
 Volunteer Disaster Responder
 Voyage Data Recorder, an electronic device on ships that records navigational status for later accident investigation (a type of black box)
 Vehicle data recorder, an electronic device in automotive units that records OBDII CAN BUS data
 Voltage Divider Rule, or Voltage Division Rule, a fundamental of electronics, that a point between multiple resistors will be at a voltage based on the ratio of resistor values.